Tremblay-en-France is a commune in the north-eastern suburbs of Paris, France.

More than one-quarter of Charles de Gaulle Airport lies within the territory of the commune of Tremblay-en-France, in particular terminals 2A, 2B, 2C and 2D (the other terminals lie in the territory of other communes). It is the largest, by area, of the so-called petite couronne (inner ring) suburbs of Paris. The corporate head office of Air France and OEMServices lie within Tremblay.

History
Originally called Tremblay-lès-Gonesse (meaning "Tremblay near Gonesse"), the commune was officially renamed Tremblay-en-France (meaning "Tremblay in the pays de France", see Roissy-en-France for an explanation) on 20 August 1989.

Heraldry

Transport
The part of Paris-Charles de Gaulle Airport that lies within the territory of the commune of Tremblay-en-France is served by two stations on Paris RER line : Aéroport Charles de Gaulle 1 and Aéroport Charles de Gaulle 2 – TGV. This last station is an interchange station with TGV national rail lines.

The inhabited area of Tremblay-en-France, however, is served by Vert-Galant station on Paris RER line . This station is located at the border between the commune of Tremblay-en-France and the commune of Villepinte, on the Villepinte side of the border.

Notable residents
Jonathan Joseph-Augustin, footballer

Economy

Air France's head office is located in the Roissypôle complex, on the grounds of Charles de Gaulle Airport and in Tremblay-en-France. The complex opened in December 1995. The complex also has the head office of Air France-KLM. Europe Airpost has its head office in the Bâtiment Le Séquoia in the commune. Servair, an Air France subsidiary, has its head office in Continental Square. Paris Aéroport is also headquartered on the airport grounds and in Tremblay.

At one point Virgin Express France (originally named Air Provence Charter), a subsidiary of Virgin Express, had its headquarters in Tremblay.

Education

Tremblay-en-France has 12 écoles maternelles, 14 écoles élémentaires, three collèges, and two lycées. The collèges are Descartes, R. Rolland, and P. de Ronsard. The lycées are Lycée Enseignement Professionnel Hélène Boucher and Lycée Polyvalent Leonard de Vinci. The École Pierre-Brossolette had been targeted for closure, prompting protests from students asking the commune to not have the school closed.

Demography

Notable buildings
Church of Saint-Médard

See also

Communes of the Seine-Saint-Denis department

References

External links

Official website 

Communes of Seine-Saint-Denis